Dinoplax validifossus, the Natal giant chiton, is a large polyplacophoran mollusc in the family Chaetopleuridae, found on the western coast of southern Africa. It was originally considered a subspecies of the giant chiton.

Description
This species is similar to the giant chiton, displaying large arched, grey or brown valves that may be heavily eroded. However, the hairs on its brown girdle are uniformly distributed rather than clumped. Adults may reach a total body length of 50–70 mm.

Distribution and habitat
Dinoplax validifossus occurs along a stretch of the west coast of South Africa from the northern Transkei to KwaZulu-Natal. It is often encountered in small groups and inhabits sandy gullies.

References

Chaetopleuridae
Molluscs of Africa
Molluscs described in 1934